This is a list of episodes of the anime series Kimi to Boku. The episodes in the anime are based from the manga series by Kiichi Hotta. An anime television adaption of Kimi to Boku was announced in the April 2011 issue of Monthly GFantasy. The series was produced by J.C. Staff under the direction of Mamoru Kanbe with scripts supervised by Reiko Yoshida and music by Elements Garden and began its broadcast run starting October 4, 2011. The series (also released in English under the title You and Me) will be split into two 13-episode seasons.

For the first season, the opening theme "Bye Bye" (バイバイ) was performed by the Japanese rock band, Seven Oops, while the ending "Nakimushi" (なきむし, lit. "Crybaby") is by Miku Sawai.

A second season was announced on the main site and started airing on April 2, 2012. The opening song "Zutto" (ずっと) is performed by a popular nico nico singer 少年T (ShounenT)/ 佐香智久 (Sako Tomohisa).

Episode list

Season 1

Season 2

References

External links 
Official anime website (Japanese)
Official Twitter website (Japanese)

Kimi to Boku